Amamibalcis is a genus of ectoparasitic sea snails, marine gastropod mollusks in the family Eulimidae.

Species

There are five known species within the genus Amamibalcis:

 Amamibalcis comoxensis (Bartsch, 1917)
 Amamibalcis conspicuus (Golikov, 1985)
 Amamibalcis flavipunctata (Habe, 1961)
 Amamibalcis gracillima (G.B. Sowerby II, 1865)
 Amamibalcis yessonensis (Rybakov & Yakolev, 1993)

Species brought into synonymy
 Amamibalcis kawamurai (Kuroda & Habe, 1950): synonym of Melanella kawamurai (Huroda & Habe, 1950).

References

External links
 To World Register of Marine Species

Eulimidae